Men in Exile is a 1937 film directed by John Farrow. A "B" movie from Warner Bros, it was the first feature Farrow directed. It is essentially a remake of their 1931 melodrama Safe in Hell, albeit with the lead switched from female to male, with some plot changes as a result.

Plot

After becoming the target of a manhunt for a murder he did not commit, cab driver Jimmy Carmody flees to a tropical island that serves as a haven for criminals on the run. Soon after he arrives, he becomes involved with gun smugglers trying to overthrow the local dictator, as well as falling for the lovely daughter of the owner of the hotel he's staying at.

Cast
 Dick Purcell as Jimmy Carmody
 June Travis as Sally Haines
 Victor Varconi as Colonel Gomez
 Olin Howland as H. Mortimer Jones
 Margaret Irving as Mother Haines
 Norman Willis as Rocky Crane
 Veda Ann Borg as Rita
 Alan Baxter as Danny Haines
 Carlos DeValdez as General Alcatraz
 Alec Harford as Limey
 John Alexander as Witherspoon
 Demetris Emanuel as Aide to Gomez

Production
In August 1936 Warners announced they would make Men in Exile the next month. They said it was a remake of Safe in Hell (1931) and would star Humphrey Bogart and Margaret Lindsay. In October Dick Purcell and June Travis were announced as stars and John Farrow was to direct.

Reception
"The direction is good and the chases are thrilling", said the Monthly Film Bulletin. "Farrow has endeavoured to dignify familiar material with a touch of Maugham but the result is not outstanding" said the Los Angeles Times.

Purcell and Travis were meant to be reunited in The Mystery of Hunting's End (which became Mystery House with Purcell and Ann Sheridan.)

References

External links
 Men in Exile at IMDb
 Men in Exile at BFI
 
 
 

1937 films
1937 crime drama films
American crime drama films
American black-and-white films
1937 directorial debut films
Films directed by John Farrow
1930s American films
1930s English-language films